The Tough Guy may refer to:

The Tough Guy (1926 film), an American Western film directed by David Kirkland
The Tough Guy (1961 film), a Greek comedy film directed by Giannis Dalianidis